George Oleg Pocheptsov VII (born January 29, 1992) is an American painter, draughtsman and entrepreneur.

Life and career

Early life

George Pocheptsov, who is sometimes also referred to as "Georgie", was born in Philadelphia, Pennsylvania, in 1992 to Ukrainian parents. When Pocheptsov was eleven months old, his father was diagnosed with brain cancer; and he died in 1995, at the age of forty. Though he was a toddler, his mother gave him a pencil and some paper to keep him busy. At seventeen months old, he drew a replica of an antique car parked across the street. At a young age, Pocheptsov was drawing jesters, pregnant women, and four-headed giraffes, all in bright color schemes. He started to paint six months before he started to talk.
Pocheptsov attended Wrightsville Beach Elementary School in Wilmington, North Carolina.

Abstract and impressionistic period (ages 6-15) 

Pocheptsov is completely self-taught in the arts.
Pocheptsov is often compared by the press to a young Pablo Picasso or Marc Chagall, particularly for his vivid color palette and early rise to fame.  His paintings can sell upward of $200,000.

Three-dimensional canvas and impressionism (ages 16-present) 

Starting around the age of 16, George started to focus more on three-dimensional canvas and impressionistic art.  The 3D canvas is effectively making a sculpture on canvas.  George creates this effect by taking a regular piece of stretched canvas and putting layers of unstretched canvas over it, and then sculpts figures on that layer. At that point, he paints the figures with multiple layers of gesso (a primer), and once they dry, he paints the details onto the sculpture.  For more detailed aspects of the sculpture, such as nose, eyelashes, fingers, etc., on a figure, he uses modeling paste.  In the end, each figure in the piece has three sides, each painted, making a truly three-dimensional impressionistic piece of art.

Collections and acquisitions 

In recent years, Pocheptsov has been commissioned to create paintings for Colin Powell, Hillary Clinton, Celine Dion, Alain Ducasse, Michael Jordan, among other famous collectors. He was commissioned to create "sculptured canvas," a self-defined technique, for the Mitchell Camera Museum in London and for the United Nations' 60th anniversary exhibition.

Pocheptsov was also invited to Geneva, Switzerland for a book titled The Arts and Copyright in which he was featured as an artistic figure.

Internationally, Pocheptsov has been featured in museums and galleries in England, France, Korea, South Africa, the Netherlands, Russia, Japan, and the Ukraine.

Appearance in popular culture 

The media and prominent art collectors refer to Pocheptsov as a child prodigy, especially in the earlier part of his life. Pocheptsov art career appears in magazines and newspapers such as The New York Times, Time, People, Parents, The Washingtonian, US Art, Art and Antiques, Art News, Architectural Digest, Southern Living, Spirit of the Carolinas, among other publications.  He has also made appearances on The Oprah Winfrey Show, Good Morning America, The John Walsh Show, The Today Show, Ripley’s Believe It or Not, The Later Today Show, and Nickelodeon.

A documentary film detailing Pocheptsov’s life titled, A Brush with Destiny, won four Emmy Awards.

Philanthropy and charitable work

The George Pocheptsov Foundation

Pocheptsov has used his art career to fund charitable contributions to several charities. In many cases, Pocheptsov donates artwork to a charitable organization, and this artwork is subsequently auctioned at a gala or fundraiser to benefit the charity. To date, Pocheptsov’s charitable foundation has donated over $8 million through the auctioning of his artwork.
 Just a few examples of the many charities supported, include the America’s Promise Alliance by Colin Powell, Georgetown University Pediatrics, Duke University Pediatrics, Adam Walsh Child Resource Center, Habitat for Humanity, the American Cancer Society, The Brain Tumor Awareness Organization, and many others. Overall, he supports between thirty and sixty charities each year. As another means to support a cause, in 2004, Pocheptsov was commissioned to create an official United States postage stamp for the Brain Tumor Awareness Organization.

Personal life

Pocheptsov speaks fluent Russian, Ukrainian, French, and English. He is also proficient in Latin.

Education 
George graduated from Harvard University in 2014.,

See also

 List of child prodigies
 List of painters
 List of American artists
 Surrealism
 Contemporary Art

References

External links 
 
  Brain Tumor Awareness Organization Website

1992 births
21st-century American painters
21st-century American male artists
American printmakers
Living people
Harvard University alumni
American male painters